Alpha Ursae Majorids is a meteor shower associated with the constellation Ursa Major. It may be caused by the comet  C/1992 W1 (Ohshita). Its IAU code is AUM.

References 

Meteor showers